Sexe fort (Eng: Stronger Gender) is the name of the seventh studio album recorded by the French artist Patricia Kaas. It was released in 2003 and achieved success in many countries, including Belgium, Switzerland and France, but its sales were less than Kaas' previous albums.

Background

This seventh studio album was released on December 1, 2003.

As for the previous albums, Kaas was surrounded by famous songwriters who had already worked with her. For example, Jean-Jacques Goldman participated with the song "C'est la faute à la vie" (Eng: "That's the Problem with Life") and "On pourrait" (Eng: "We Could"), which he also produced himself ; by the way, this last song was recorded as a duet with the Swiss artist Stephan Eicher. Pascal Obispo, who was particularly involved in the composing of Le Mot de passe, wrote the song "L'Abbé Caillou" (Eng: "The Abbot Caillou"), whose title is a play with and a tribute to the Abbé Pierre. French singers and songwriters Patrick Fiori, Louis Bertignac and Renaud also participated in the writing of at least one song.

This album was followed by a tour performed by the singer around the world, the seventh one.

Chart performances and critical reception

In France, the album was not as successful as Kaas' first five studio albums. It went to #9 on November 30, 2003, then dropped almost every week. It managed to stabilize in the low positions and totaled only 12 weeks in the top 50, 15 weeks in the top 100 and 39 weeks on the chart (top 200). It was certified double gold and appeared respectively at #70 and #150 on 2003 and 2004 End of the Year Charts.

In Belgium (Wallonia), the album started at #35 on December 6, 2003, before climbing to #5 and finally reached #3. However, it fell off the top ten after its fourth week and dropped slowly on the chart, until its 16th week.

In Switzerland, the album was charted for 14 weeks, from December 14, 2003, to March 21, 2004. It peaked at #6 in it second week and remained for three weeks in the top ten, and ten weeks in the top 50. It achieved gold status.

The album met a moderate success in Finland, peaking at #31 with only two weeks on the chart, and #55 in Germany.

Following the release of Sexe fort, Kaas received a particular distinction on December 8, 2003, when she received the First Class Order of Merit of the Federal Republic of Germany for her contribution to friendship between France and Germany, an honour that until then had been awarded to only a few international artists.

Track listing

Credits

Recording

 Arranged by Frédéric Helbert
 Except : Jean-Jacques Goldman and Erick Benzi (6, 9), Pierre Jaconelli (2), Frédéric Helbert and Louis Bertignac (15), Frédéric Helbert and Pascal B.Carmen (12), Thierry "Tyty" Blanchard and J.Kapler (10)
 Executive producer and vocal direction : Richard Walter
 Engineer, mixing : Bruno Fourrier
 Assistant : Matthieu Dallaporta
 Additional engineers : Erick Benzi and Phil Delire
 Except mixing : Erick Benzi and le Triangle (6, 9), Bruno Fourrier and Pierre Jaconelli (2), Thierry Blanchard "Tyty" (12)
 Assistants Capri : Manuel Farolfi, Riccardo Durante
 Artistic direction : Michel Boulanger
 In charge of production : Richard Walter Productions (Martine Trendel, Ghislaine Real)
 Recorded and mixed at Studios ICP (Brussels, Belgium), Capri Digital Studio (Capri, Italy)
 Mastering : JC Beaudon à Translab
 Artwork : peggy.m / Malo
 Photos : peggy.m
 Light conception : Hamoudi Laggoune from C4 Productions
 Make up : Aurélia Jugenet
 Hairdresser : Jean-Paul Ealet
 Management : ITC (Richard Walter, Cyril Prieur), Zurich, Switzerland

Musicians and vocalists

 Keyboards, syncs and proclamations : Frédéric Helbert (1, 3-5, 7, 8, 11-15), Matthieu Vaughan (2), Pancho, Erick Benzi and Charly Valora (6, 9), Thierry "Tyty" Blanchard (10)
 Guitars : Frédéric Helbert, Milton Mc Donald, Pierre Jaconelli, Pascal B.Carmen, Louis Bertignac, Jeff Bourassin, André Hampartzoumian, Bruno Le Roux
 Bass : Nicolas Fiszman, Bernard Viguié
 Drum kit : Roy Martin, Ian Thomas, Amaury Blanchard
 Harmonica : "Diabolo" (3, 4, 7, 13)
 Piano : Jean-Jacques Goldman (9)
 First violins : Mark Steylaerts, Marian Taché, Vadin Tsiboulevsky, Eric Baeten, Gudrun Vercampt, Karel Ingelaere, Maurits Goosens, Eva Zylka
 Second violins : Véronique Gilis, Bart Lammens, Carol Minor, Alissa Vaitsner, Eva Vermeeren, Dirk Uten
 Violas : Marc Tooten, Philippe Allard, Jeroen Robbrecht, Liesbeth De Lombaert, Katrien Smedts
 Cellos : Karel Steylaerts, Lode Vercampt, Herwig Coryn, Sigrid Van Den Bogaerde
 Double bass : Koenraad Hofman, Charice Adriaansen
 Background vocals : Dominique "Doudou" Greffier (1, 3, 12, 15), Dark Vador (1,3), Pascal Obispo (2), Jean-Jacques Goldman and Erick Benzi (6), Louis Bertignac (15)

Charts

Weekly charts

Monthly charts

Year-end charts

Certifications and sales

References

2003 albums
Patricia Kaas albums